Frederick Douglas Chapman (21 March 1901 – 27 June 1964) was an Australian sportsman who played first-class cricket with Victoria and Australian rules football for Fitzroy in the Victorian Football League (VFL).

Chapman played two games at Fitzroy, one each in the 1920 and 1921 VFL seasons, before going to Coburg. As a cricketer he bowled right-arm medium pace and took seven wickets at 28.00 from his four first-class matches. Five of those wickets came in a match against Tasmania at the Melbourne Cricket Ground in 1930/31 and included a haul of 4/69 in the second innings.

See also
 List of Victoria first-class cricketers

References

External links

Cricinfo: Frederick Chapman

1901 births
1964 deaths
People educated at Scotch College, Melbourne
Australian cricketers
Victoria cricketers
Fitzroy Football Club players
Coburg Football Club players
Cricketers from Melbourne
Australian rules footballers from Melbourne
People from Fitzroy, Victoria